The Dioces of Thysdrus (Latin: Dioecesis Thysdritana) is a suppressed and titular See of the Roman Catholic Church.

History 
Thysdrus, corresponding to the city of El Jem in present-day Tunisia, is an ancient episcopal seat of the Roman province of Byzacena.
Thysdrus was the seat of a council celebrated in 417. The bishopric lasted until the Muslim conquest of the Maghreb, but was reborn in name at least in the early 20th century as a titular see.
Today Thysdrus survives as a titular bishop's seat, the current titular bishop is Abelardo Alvarado Alcántara, former auxiliary bishop of Mexico City.

Bishops
 Elpidio (mentioned in 393) took part in the Council of Cabarsussi, held in 393 by the Maximianists, a moderate sect of the Donatists, and he signed the deeds.
 Navigio (mentioned in 411) at the Carthage conference of 411, which saw together the Catholic and Donatist bishops of Roman Africa, the Catholic Navigio and Honorato a Donatist both attended.
 Honored (mentioned in 411) (Donatist bishop at the Council of Carthage)
 Venerio (mentioned in 641) intervened at the antimonotelite council of 641.
 Carlos Quintero Arce (1966 * 1968)
 Raymond Larose (1968 - 1984)
 Abelardo Alvarado Alcántara, (1985-current)

References

Catholic titular sees in Africa
Roman towns and cities in Africa (Roman province)
Cities in Tunisia
Catholic Church in Tunisia